Judith-De Brésoles Ecological Reserve is an ecological reserve in Quebec, Canada. It was established in 1992.

References

External links
 Official website from Government of Québec

Protected areas of Mauricie
Nature reserves in Quebec
Protected areas established in 1992
Geography of La Tuque, Quebec
1992 establishments in Quebec